The 2001 New Hampshire Wildcats football team was an American football team that represented the University of New Hampshire as a member of the Atlantic 10 Conference during the 2001 NCAA Division I-AA football season. In its third year under head coach Sean McDonnell, the team compiled a 4–7 record (2–7 against conference opponents) and finished tenth out of eleven teams in the Atlantic 10 Conference.

Schedule

References

New Hampshire
New Hampshire Wildcats football seasons
New Hampshire Wildcats football